The Hong Kong Songs is a record chart that ranks the best-performing songs in Hong Kong since February 2022. Published by Billboard magazine, the data are compiled by MRC Data based collectively on each single's weekly digital streaming and download sales. It was announced on February 14, 2022, as part of Billboards Hits of the World chart collection, ranking the top 25 songs weekly in more than 40 countries around the globe.

Every Tuesday, a new chart is compiled and officially released to the public on its website. Each chart is dated with the "week-ending" date of the Saturday four days later.

2023

List of number-one songs

2022

Song milestones

Most weeks at number one

List of number-one songs

References

Hong Kong Songs
Cantopop